Hurricane Danielle was a long-lived Cape Verde hurricane in late August and early September 1998. The fourth named storm and second hurricane of the annual hurricane season, Danielle originated from a tropical wave that emerged off the western coast of Africa on August 21. Tracking generally west-northwestward, the disturbance was initially disorganized; under favorable atmospheric conditions, shower and thunderstorm activity began to consolidate around a low-pressure center. Following a series of satellite intensity estimates, the system was upgraded to Tropical Depression Four during the pre-dawn hours of August 24, and further to Tropical Storm Danielle that afternoon. Moving around the southern periphery of the Azores High located in the northeastern Atlantic, quick intensification to hurricane status occurred early on August 25. Increased wind shear from a nearby trough encroached on further development later that day, and subsequently led to slight weakening. By 1200 UTC on August 27, despite continued unfavorable conditions, Danielle reached a second peak intensity equal to the first. Weakening once ensued late on August 27 in addition to the days following, and Danielle was a low-end Category 1 hurricane by August 31 as its forward speed slowed.

As the cyclone reached the western periphery of the ridge that steered it across the Atlantic for much of its existence, it began yet another period of intensification, and once again attained a peak intensity as a Category 2 hurricane. Passing northwest of Bermuda, Danielle weakened to Category 1 hurricane strength, but for a final time intensified into a  tropical cyclone thereafter. As the cyclone passed over increasingly cool sea surface temperatures and became intertwined in a baroclinic zone, it began to undergo an extratropical transition. At 0000 UTC on September 4, Danielle was no longer considered a tropical cyclone, despite retaining hurricane-force winds. Several days later, the remnants of Danielle merged with a larger extratropical low and became indistinguishable. As a tropical cyclone, it produced heavy rainfall in Puerto Rico and the Lesser Antilles, leading to flooding. Tropical storm-force winds were observed in Bermuda even though the cyclone passed well northwest of the island. During Danielle's transition to an extratropical cyclone, it produced light rain and led to minor beach erosion in Newfoundland. The larger extratropical low that merged with the system resulted in large waves off the coast of the United Kingdom, leading to major beach erosion and coastal flooding. Overall, no fatalities were reported with the system and it caused an estimated $50,000 (1998 USD) in damage.

Meteorological history

The origins of Hurricane Danielle trace back to a tropical wave that emerged off the western coast of Africa and into the eastern Atlantic Ocean early on August 21. Tracking west-northwestward, the National Hurricane Center (NHC) began Dvorak satellite intensity estimates later that morning following the consolidation of convection – shower and thunderstorm activity – near the system's center. Operationally, the National Hurricane Center initiated advisories at 1530 UTC and noted that the depression was already on the verge of tropical storm intensity. The depression was upgraded to Tropical Storm Danielle later on August 24 following an increase in organization on satellite imagery.

As the cyclone moved northwestward along the southern periphery of the Azores High, it began a period of rapid deepening in which a "pinhole" eye became distinguishable on satellite imagery; on this basis, Danielle was upgraded to a hurricane at 1200 UTC on August 25. At the time, Danielle was a compact system, with tropical storm force winds spanning only  from the center. Although the NHC was fairly certain that the storm would continue west-northwestward, a veer north or south of the forecast track seemed plausible due to the influence of an upper-level low to the west-northwest of Danielle. Nonetheless, the storm continued its west-northwest track.

Vertical wind shear persisted and Danielle soon began to weaken again. Later on August 27, the National Hurricane Center predicted that the storm would travel along the periphery of an anticyclone centered just east of Bermuda, which would keep the storm away from the East Coast of the United States. Despite being in an apparently favorable environment, Danielle continued to slowly weaken, as the forecast for decreasing wind shear did not initially materialize. Additionally, upwelling from Hurricane Bonnie roughly a week earlier contributed to a decrease in strength. Although the storm weakened further, reconnaissance aircraft observations on August 29 concluded that the structure of Danielle had improved compared to the previous day. On August 30, the National Hurricane Center noted that Danielle would soon leave the upwelling track left by Bonnie, and likely lead to intensification. Thus, the possibility of re-strengthening increased, though predictions only showed gradual intensification. 

On August 31, the anticyclone near Bermuda caused Danielle to curve northeastward, away from the East Coast of the United States. On September 1, there was significant uncertainty in the future intensity of Danielle, as a shortwave trough located northeast of the storm would either enhance outflow, causing strengthening, or increase wind shear, resulting in weakening. At 1500 UTC on September 1, it was predicted that Danielle would strengthen slightly before weakening and becoming extratropical by September 3.

Early on September 2, the storm weakened again and was downgraded to a Category 1 hurricane. As late as 1500 UTC on September 3, satellite imagery indicated that Danielle was retaining tropical characteristics. The National Hurricane Center did not forecast any further weakening before the extratropical transition, but instead mentioned the possibility of baroclinic strengthening. Late on September 3, the final advisory was issued on the transitioning storm. Danielle officially transitioned into an extratropical cyclone at 0000 UTC on September 4 according to a post-season report from the NHC, while located east-southeast of Newfoundland. The remnants of Danielle traversed east and eventually northeastward across the Atlantic Ocean. It produced rough seas in the British Isles on September 6 before merging with an extratropical low pressure area north of Ireland on September 8.

Preparations and impact
Shortly after formation, Danielle was considered a potential threat to the Lesser Antilles, with the National Hurricane Center noting that "any deviation to the left of the track would bring Danielle closer [to] the Leeward Islands." However, Danielle bypassed far enough north of the Lesser Antilles to prevent any tropical storm or hurricane watches or warnings. Several days later, the storm was considered a possible threat to Florida by local newspapers, though the National Hurricane Center accurately predicted a re-curvature from the United States mainland well in advance. At 1500 UTC on September 1, at which time Danielle was situated northeast of the Bahamas, a tropical storm warning was issued for Bermuda; this was later cancelled after Danielle passed northwest of the island.

The outer bands of Danielle produced heavy rainfall in Puerto Rico, causing street flooding and landslides in Bayamón, Guaynabo, Toa Alta, and Vega Alta; several streams overflowed their banks, causing additional flooding. In a neighborhood of Bayamón, one house was damaged after a wall collapsed. Losses in Puerto Rico totaled to approximately $50,000 (1998 USD). Hurricane Bonnie ripped an artificial reef composed of tires offshore Atlantic Beach, North Carolina in late August. Danielle washed numerous of these loose tires ashore, especially on Emerald Isle. As a result, the Governor of North Carolina, Jim Hunt, requested prison labor and the National Guard to clean up beaches from Brunswick County to Carteret County. Instead of resulting in further erosion in the aftermath of Bonnie farther up along the coast, Danielle led to a  increase in sand along the New Jersey coastline. However, other than light rainfall in Newfoundland, the storm caused no impact in Canada. Tori Murden, an American attempting to become the first woman to solo row across the Atlantic Ocean, encountered rough seas from the storm and its remnants. By September 7, Murden sent out a distress signal and was rescued by the Independent Spirit later that day.

While passing near the British Isles on September 6 as an extratropical storm, Danielle produced severe sea conditions on the western part of the isles. Major beach erosion was observed, and many people required rescuing. Coastal portions of Cornwall were evacuated as high waves inundated many homes, and an all-terrain police vehicle was shoved into the sea by a rogue wave in the Isles of Scilly. An 11‑year-old boy and his father were trapped in a sea cave on the north coast of Cornwall due to rough surf. Two other men from Port Isaac also became isolated in the same location after their boat capsized. All four were eventually rescued by a helicopter that hovered near the entrance of the sea cave. At the West Sands Caravan Park near Selsey, West Sussex, twelve families were evacuated to higher ground. A yacht carrying eight people ran aground near Calshot; they required rescuing by the Solent Coastguards. Flash flooding was reported throughout Wiltshire, especially in the town of Melksham. Numerous motorists were left stranded in inundated streets, while water entered several homes, store basements, a fire station, and the Cooper Avon tyre factory.

See also

Hurricane Faith
Tropical cyclone effects in Europe
Other storms of the same name

References

External links

1998 Monthly Weather Review
National Hurricane Center Preliminary Report on Hurricane Danielle

1998 Atlantic hurricane season
Danielle (1998)
Category 2 Atlantic hurricanes
1998 in the United Kingdom
1998 disasters in the United Kingdom
1998 natural disasters in the United States
1998 disasters in Canada